Lee Eun-gyeol (born October 2, 1981) is a South Korean magician. Lee started performing magic in 1996 and became the first Korean magician to win the grand prize at the esteemed F.I.S.M World Championiship of Magic. He is one of the most recognized magicians in South Korea, having appeared on and hosted various South Korean variety programs, such as My Little Television, Trick & True, and I live Alone.

Awards
 "Asia World Magic Contest" (Nagoya), 2001, Winner
 "SA Magic Championship" (Cape Town), 2002, Winner
 "Las Vegas World Magic Seminar" (Las Vegas), 2003, Golden Lion Award Grand Prix
 "FISM" (The Hague), 2003, Runner-up
 "Magic Festival" (Paris), 2003, Les Mandrakes d'or
 "Singapore International Magic Festival" (Singapore), 2005, achievement award
 "IMS" (Stockholm), 2011, Merlin award

References

External links
 

1982 births
Living people
People from Gyeonggi Province
People from Pyeongtaek
South Korean magicians
South Korean television personalities